Black Oak Arkansas is an American Southern rock band named after the band's hometown of Black Oak, Arkansas. The band reached the height of its fame in the 1970s charting ten albums according to Encyclopedia of Arkansas.  Their style is punctuated by multiple guitar players and the raspy voice and on-stage antics of vocalist Jim "Dandy" Mangrum.

History

The Knowbody Else
Black Oak Arkansas, originally named "The Knowbody Else," was formed in 1963 by some "high school pals" living in the area around Black Oak, Arkansas. Original members included Ronnie "Chicky Hawk" Smith (vocals), Rickie Lee (alternately "Risky" or "Ricochet") Reynolds (guitar), Stanley "Goober Grin" Knight (guitar), Harvey "Burley" Jett (guitar), Pat "Dirty" Daugherty (bass), and Wayne "Squeezebox" Evans (drums).  At some point the band and Ronnie "Chicky Hawk" Smith agreed that a mutual friend named James "Jim Dandy" Mangrum would make a better front man, while Smith agreed that he himself would make a better stage production manager.

The band's first PA system was stolen from Monette High School. The group then cleaned out an old galvanized grain bin on the edge of town and began blasting out ear-piercing sounds that echoed their special blend of music that came from rock, gospel, country and blues influences. Members of the group were subsequently charged in absentia with grand larceny and sentenced to 26 years at the Tucker Prison Farm, a sentence that was later suspended. This led to their retreat to the hills of rural north-central Arkansas where they lived off the land and refined their musical style.  They also lived in Long Beach, Mississippi, and played at the local Lobe theater/dance hall and the short-lived venue, "The Black Rainbow." Some of their influences during this time were the Beatles and the Byrds.

The Knowbody Else moved to Memphis, Tennessee, in 1969 and signed a record deal with Stax Records. Their self-titled debut album (Hip Records #HIS-7003 [a subsidiary of Stax]) was largely ignored by the public. During this time the band became interested in psychedelia and Eastern spiritualism which, combined with their Southern Baptist upbringing, contributed to their sound.

Black Oak Arkansas
After several trips to Los Angeles, California, in 1970, the band was signed by Atco Records (whose parent label, Atlantic Records, once had a partnership with Stax) and rechristened Black Oak Arkansas.  Their self-titled debut album Black Oak Arkansas was released in 1971. The record featured enduring BOA classics such as "Hot and Nasty", "Lord Have Mercy On My Soul", "Uncle Lijiah" (written in pseudo-tribute to Harvey Jett's real-life great uncle) and "When Electricity Came To Arkansas", which was accused by fundamentalist religious groups of containing backward-masked "Satanic messages" (possibly from a live performance of the song in which Mangrum utters "dog si eh" and "natas" three times). The band toured extensively, gaining a reputation as a premier live act throughout the early 1970s all across America, and later even in Europe. Keep the Faith followed in 1972, featuring the manic concert staple "Fever in My Mind". Drummer Wayne Evans left the band and was replaced by journeyman drummer Tommy Aldridge on BOA's next release If an Angel Came to See You, Would You Make Her Feel at Home?, which featured another enduring BOA concert favorite, "Mutants of the Monster" and expanded on the group's eclectic musical style.

In 1973, Black Oak Arkansas released their fourth LP, Raunch 'n' Roll Live, and took the rather unorthodox tack of including previously unreleased new songs on their first live concert album like "Gigolo", "Gettin' Kinda Cocky", as well as two more BOA classics: "Hot Rod", which features Dandy's sly double-entendre lyrics, and "Up", which spotlights Aldridge's marathon drum solo, a portion of which he played with his bare hands. The four new songs were originally recorded and intended to be included on the follow-up studio album to If an Angel Came to See You ..., but when Atco Records realized the band's true strong suit was their concert act, the live album resulted. Raunch 'n' Roll Live was re-issued in 2007 by Rhino Records as a 2-CD set containing both concerts that the original vinyl album was culled from. The band's fifth album, High on the Hog, also released in 1973, ended up being the high point of BOA's career, peaking at number 52 on the Billboard albums chart. Ruby Starr also toured intermittently with Black Oak during this period, and her raspy voice can be heard on the group's remake of LaVern Baker's 1957 hit "Jim Dandy (To The Rescue)", which reached number 25 on the Billboard Hot 100. Baker's song was recorded at the suggestion of Elvis Presley, when he invited BOA to Graceland.

The band was riding high on the concert trail as well by this time, headlining large venues like Kansas City's Arrowhead Stadium and Charlotte Motor Speedway, and the Royal Albert Hall in London, England. Black Oak Arkansas also played at the California Jam festival in Ontario, California, on April 6, 1974. The concert attracted over 200,000 fans, and BOA appeared alongside Black Sabbath; Eagles; Emerson, Lake & Palmer; Deep Purple; Earth, Wind & Fire; Seals and Crofts; and Rare Earth. Portions of the show were telecast on ABC Television in the US, exposing the band to a wider audience.

The follow-up to High on the Hog, 1974's Street Party (featuring "Son of a Gun", "Hey Ya'll" and "Dixie", as well as a cover of the Motown classic "Dancing in the Street"), may have failed to maintain the momentum, but another 1974 release entitled Early Times, a shelved Stax recording by The Knowbody Else (now released on the back of their success and under the BOA banner), made up for lost time. Guitarist Harvey Jett left the band after Street Party and was replaced by Jimmy "Soybean" Henderson in 1975 and he debuted on the band's final studio album for Atco Records, Ain't Life Grand. This album included a snarly remake of George Harrison's Beatles classic "Taxman", as well as new originals like "Fancy Nancy", "Rebel", "Good Stuff", "Cryin' Shame", and "Let Life Be Good to You". The band signed a contract with MCA and promptly released X-Rated later in 1975, which marked the beginning of Black Oak Arkansas's decline. In 1976, they released two fairly nondescript and unsuccessful albums for MCA, Balls of Fire and 10 Yr Overnight Success, the latter as a five-piece band with the departure of Rickie Reynolds, who was more or less replaced on tour by keyboardist Marius Penczner during this period. Also in 1976, Atco released a final BOA contractual-obligation album, the poorly-recorded but high-spirited Live! Mutha, recorded on Mother's Day, 1975, in Long Beach, California. This recording saw a reappearance of Ruby Starr.

Black Oak
Following continued diminishing returns of the band's record sales (yet while still remaining a consistent concert draw), Mangrum dropped "Arkansas" from the group's name (in an attempt to downplay their Southern-ness) and replaced everyone except Henderson and even altering his own vocal style in an attempt to sound more mainstream (and ostensibly impress music critics in the process). The other members of the "Black Oak" lineup were Greg Reding (guitar and keyboards), Jack Holder (guitar), Andy Tanas (bass), and Joel Williams (drums). Black Oak released two albums on the struggling Capricorn Records, Race with the Devil in 1977 and I'd Rather Be Sailing the following year. Neither album sold well. In 1978, guitarist Shawn Lane joined the band at age 14 and toured with the band for four years.

Post-Capricorn Records
In the early 1980s, Dandy temporarily left the band for health reasons, but Reynolds kept the band going with former Zorro bassist Jack Brumby, AW Zeugner, and Les John. Bob Simpson took on lead vocals at first, but was later replaced by Randy Ruff for almost three years, until Mangrum's return. In 1984, the band released Ready as Hell. Though the name "Black Oak Arkansas" was on the album cover, "Jim Dandy" appeared above it in larger type, almost as if it were a solo effort. Ready as Hell featured a heavier sound with pinch harmonics and keyboards featured throughout. The album was also Rickie Lee Reynolds's first recording with Mangrum since the MCA years. In 1986, The Black Attack Is Back continued the heavy style of the previous album and featured the particularly adventurous track "I Want A Woman With Big Titties". Again, "Jim Dandy" received top billing on the album cover (though "BOA"—the band's initials—did appear above the frontman's name). Like its predecessor, The Black Attack Is Back made no commercial headway. In 1992, the band released Rebound, this time under the band's aegis, with similar results. Things changed little with 1999's The Wild Bunch, which was released under the name "Jim Dandy's Black Oak Arkansas". However, an original member would rejoin Black Oak and appear on this album. Patrick "Dirty" Daugherty rejoined in 1995, rekindling the once-forgotten Black Oak Arkansas. This momentum brought on a surge of performances with other 70's greats such as Foghat, Iron Butterfly, Edgar Winter Group, and many more. During the early 2000s, original lead guitarist Stanley Knight would join them on the road, not playing guitar, but as their soundman. Pat left the band a second time in the mid-2000s.

James Mangrum has continued recording and touring with a series of different Black Oak lineups, up to the present day. Black Oak Arkansas currently enjoys a loyal fan following. Jim Dandy is credited with inspiring Van Halen frontman David Lee Roth's image and onstage persona. In addition, in the 1980s former Maine State Representative Chris Greeley once 'opened' for them as a member of the rock band Toyz.

The return to Atlantic Records
The band released an album for Atlantic Records/Atco Records on October 15, 2013, titled Back Thar N' Over Yonder. The album contained five newly recorded songs and 10 previously unreleased 1970s tracks which were produced by Tom Dowd. The new songs featured a line-up of original and current members. Reunited originals Jim "Dandy" Mangrum, Rickie Lee "Risky" Reynolds, Pat "Dirty" Daugherty, and Jimmy "Soybean" Henderson, were joined by current drummer Johnnie Bolin, bassist George Hughen, guitarist Buddy Church and lead guitarist Hal McCormack. The first single off the record "Plugged In And Wired" was released August 26, 2013. The band toured to support the album.

Underdog Heroes 
On May 24, 2019, Black Oak Arkansas released Underdog Heroes, their first album consisting of all new recordings in 30 years. The album featured Mangrum, Reynolds, and Sammy B Seauphine who has been a member since 2014 and present.

List of classic band members
 James L. Mangrum (AKA Jim "Dandy" Mangrum) – lead vocals, washboard (1968–early 1980s, 1983–present)
 Rickie Lee "Risky"/"Ricochet" Reynolds – rhythm guitar, 12-string guitar, vocals (1965–1977, 1984–2021) 
 Harvey "Burley" Jett – lead guitar, banjo, piano, vocals (1965–1974) 
 Pat "Dirty" Daugherty – bass guitar, vocals (1965–1977, 1996–2002)
 Wayne "Squeezebox" Evans – drums (1965–1972)
 Stanley "Goober Grin" Knight – lead guitar, steel guitar, organ, vocals (1969–1976) 
 Tommy Aldridge – drums (1972–1976) Later joined Pat Travers Band; also played for Gary Moore, Ozzy Osbourne, and Whitesnake, among others.

Current touring band members
 James L. Mangrum (AKA Jim "Dandy" Mangrum) – lead vocals, guitar, washboard (1968–early 1980s, 1983–present)
 Sammy B. Seauphine ("Lil Bit") – duet vocals, backing vocals, washboard (2013–present)
 Tim Rossi – lead and rhythm guitarist, backing vocals(2021–present)
 Kinley "Barney" Wolfe – bass guitar, backing vocals (1981–1983) (2021–present)
 Sammi Jo Bishop – drums (2022)

Past members
 Randy Ruff – lead vocals, piano, organ (1980–1982)
 Rickie Lee "Risky"/"Ricochet" Reynolds – rhythm guitar, 12-string guitar, keyboards, backing vocals (1965–1977, 1984–2021) (died 2021)
 Ruby Starr – duet vocals, backing vocals (1973–1976) (died 1995)
 Pat "Dirty" Daugherty – bass guitar, vocals (1970–1977, 1996–2002)
 Andy Tanas – bass guitar (1977–1979)
 Dave Wilson – bass guitar (1979–1981) (died 2013)
 George Hughen – bass guitar (1985–1996, 2002–2016)
 Jimmy "Soybean" Henderson – guitar (1975–1979) (died 2016)
 Deke Richards – guitar, piano (1977–1978)
 Greg Reding – guitar, keyboards, vocals (1977–1979)
 Jack Holder – guitar (1977–1979) (died 2015)
 Shawn Lane – guitar (1978–1982) (died 2003)
 Gavin Frisbee – guitar (1978–1980)
 Dave Amato – guitar (1980)
 Mick Chelsvig – guitar (1980–1981)
 Tony Bullard – guitar (1981–1982)
 Robert Gregory – guitar (1985)
 Angelo Earl – guitar (late 1980s)
 Buddy Church – guitar (1989–1994, 2013–2016) (died 2016)
 Harvey "Burley" Jett – lead guitar, banjo, piano, vocals (1970–1974) 
 Stanley "Goober Grin" Knight – lead guitar, steel guitar, organ, vocals (1970–1976) (died 2013)
 Hal McCormack – lead guitar (2003–2016)
 Kevin Rees – lead guitar (early 1980s)
 John Roth – lead guitar (July 1986–October 1987, 1991)
 Arthur Pearson – lead guitar, rhythm guitar (1989–present/on call)
 Kevyn Williams – lead guitar (early 1990s)
 Danny Leath – lead guitar (199?–????)
 Rocky Athas – lead guitar (1996–2001)
 Terry "Slydman" Powers – lead guitar (2000–2004)
 Wayne "Squeezebox" Evans – drums (1970–1972)
 Gary "GT" Taylor – drums (1970–1972)
 Tommy Aldridge – drums (1972–1976)
 Bobby "T" Torello – drums (1977)
 Abel Ji McKnight – drums (1977–1982)
 Joel Williams – drums (1977–1978)
 Randii Meers – drums (1978–1979)
 Les John – drums (1980–1981)
 Chris Craig – drums (1979–1982)
 Darrell Miller – drums (1970s)
 Cozy Johnson – drums (early 1980s)
 Paul Simmons – drums (1985–1986)
 Victor Lukenbaugh – drums (1989–2016, 2018–2020) (died 2020)
 Marius Penczner – keyboards (1975–1977)
 David "Dave" Mayo – piano, bass guitar (1976)
 Gary D. Rollins – keyboards (1978)

Session members
 Kenny Rodgers – guitar
 Alex Among – guitar
 Steve "The Axe" Nunenmacher – lead guitar, rhythm guitar (Ready As Hell) Later formed Lillian Axe as 'Steve Blaze'
 William Lemuel – bass guitar (Ready As Hell)
 Jon "J.R."/"Thunder Paws" Wells – drums (Ready As Hell)
 Billy Batte – keyboards, violin (Ready As Hell)
 Michael "Narley Dude" Martin – lead guitar (The Black Attack Is Back) (died 2005)
 Biff "The Beast" Bingham – 2nd lead guitar (Ready As Hell, The Black Attack Is Back)
 Mike Farriss – bass guitar (The Black Attack Is Back)
 Jerry A. Williams – drums (Ready As Hell, The Black Attack Is Back)
 Garrett Bearden – drums (1980s)
 Mickey "Tricky" Smith – drums, road tech

Deceased members
Singer Ruby Starr died of cancer on January 14, 1995. She had a soaring solo career as well as several of her own bands. 

Original Black Oak Arkansas guitarist Stanley Knight (born on February 12, 1949, in Little Rock, Arkansas) died on February 16, 2013, four days after his 64th birthday, following a brief battle with cancer.

Black Oak-era guitarist Jack Holder (born Richard Jackson Holder Jr. on August 26, 1952) died from cancer on January 13, 2015, at the age of 62.

Former guitarist Jimmy Henderson (born James David Henderson on May 20, 1954) died unexpectedly on March 5, 2016, at the age of 61.

Original and long-time guitarist Rickie Lee Reynolds (born on October 28, 1948, in Manila, Arkansas) died on September 5, 2021, after being hospitalized due to COVID-19 and then suffering from kidney and heart failure, at the age of 72.

Former lead guitarist Harvey Jett (born William Harvey Jett on February 17, 1949, in Jonesboro, Arkansas) died on December 21, 2022, at the age of 73.

Timeline

Discography

Albums

The Knowbody Else
The Knowbody Else (Hip Records #HIS-7003 [a subsidiary of Stax Records], October, 1969; reissued 2008 on Purple Pyramid/Cleopatra Records)
Soldiers of Pure Peace (Arf! Arf! Music, November 13, 2012; demo material originally recorded in 1967)

Black Oak Arkansas
Black Oak Arkansas (Atco Records, March, 1971) US No. 127, RIAA Gold
Keep the Faith (Atco, January, 1972) US No. 103
If an Angel Came to See You, Would You Make Her Feel at Home? (Atco, June, 1972) US No. 93
Raunch 'N' Roll Live (Atco, February, 1973; recorded December 1 & 2, 1972) US No. 90, RIAA Gold
High on the Hog (Atco, September, 1973) US No. 52, RIAA Gold; Can. No. 81 
Early Times (Stax Records, March, 1974; demo material originally recorded in 1968/1969 as The Knowbody Else)
Street Party (Atco, July, 1974) US No. 56; Can No. 52 
Ain't Life Grand (Atco, April, 1975) US No. 145
X-Rated (MCA Records, September, 1975) US No. 99
Live! Mutha (Atco, January, 1976; recorded May 11, 1975) US No. 194; Can No. 90 
Balls of Fire (MCA, May, 1976) US No. 173; Can No. 71 
10 Yr Overnight Success (MCA, October, 1976)
Rebound (Goldwax Records #GW-5003, 1991)
King Biscuit Flower Hour Presents: Black Oak Arkansas (King Biscuit Flower Hour Records/BMG, March 10, 1998; recorded November 21, 1976, at the Reading Festival in England)
Live on the King Biscuit Flower Hour (King Biscuit Entertainment/Pinnacle, September 27, 1999; reissue of the KBFH material...all 12 songs)
Live (EMI-Capitol Special Markets [a subsidiary of Capitol-EMI Records], May 4, 2000; another reissue of the KBFH material minus 2 songs)
Keep the Faith: Live Concert Performance (Disky Communications, 2001; yet another reissue of the KBFH material...all 12 songs)
Live at Royal Albert Hall (S'More Entertainment, November 25, 2005; recorded 1975)
The Complete Raunch 'N' Roll Live (Rhino Handmade Records, 2007) 2CD
Black Oak Arkansas...The Knowbody Else '69 (Purple Pyramid/Cleopatra Records, 2008; reissue of Hip Records #HIS-7003)
Back Thar N' Over Yonder (Atlantic/Atco Records, October 15, 2013; includes 5 new songs with 10 previously unreleased studio out-takes from 1972/1973/1974)
Underdog Heroes (Purple Pyramid/Cleopatra Records, May 24, 2019)
On Top of the Covers (cleopatra records 2023)

Note: all of BOA's original Atco albums have been reissued on CD by Wounded Bird Records in 2000/2001, 
except High On The Hog, which has been reissued by Rhino Records; also note that in 2013, the first 
five Atco studio albums (BOA, Keep the Faith, If an Angel Came to See You, High on the Hog, and Street Party) were collected/reissued in a slipcase box set, titled Black Oak Arkansas: Original Album Series [UPC: 081227968373] by Rhino Entertainment; and in 2021, seven albums (X-Rated, Live! Reading '76 [=KBFH Presents: BOA], Race with the Devil, I'd Rather Be Sailing, Ready as Hell, The Black Attack is Back, and Rebound) were collected/reissued in another slipcase box set, titled Jim Dandy to the Rescue [UPC: 889466206726] by Purple Pyramid/Cleopatra Records.

Jim Dandy (without BOA)Flash Fearless Versus the Zorg Women, Parts 5 & 6 (Chrysalis Records, 1975) -note: Jim Dandy sings 2 songs..."Country Cooking" and "Blast Off" on this various artists/original studio cast "comic book hero/rock opera" album.

Black OakRace with the Devil (Capricorn Records, November, 1977)I'd Rather Be Sailing (Capricorn, June, 1978)

Jim Dandy's Black Oak ArkansasReady as Hell (Hacienda Records, 1984)The Black Attack is Back (Heavy Metal America Records, 1986)The Wild Bunch (Deadline/Cleopatra Records, November 2, 1999)Top Musicians Play ZZ Top (Sleeping Giant Records, 2010) -note: Jim Dandy's BOA do just one song..."La Grange" on this various artists "tribute" album.Underdog Heroes (Cleopatra Records) May 24,2019On Top of the Covers (Cleopatra Records) 2023

Compilations
 Hot and Nasty (The Best of Black Oak Arkansas) (Atlantic/WEA [UK], 1974) -note: single LP with 12 tracks 
 The Best of Black Oak Arkansas (Atco, April, 1977)
 Hot & Nasty: The Best of Black Oak Arkansas (Rhino Records, 1992)
  'Hot And Nasty' And Other Hits (Flashback/Rhino Records, 1997)
 The Definitive Rock Collection (Atlantic/Rhino Records, October 17, 2006) 2-CD set

Charted Singles
"Jim Dandy (To the Rescue)" (Atco, December, 1973; from the High on the Hog album) US No. 25; Can No. 12 
"Strong Enough to Be Gentle" (MCA, January, 1976; from the X-Rated album) US No. 89

BooksAn Analysis of the Southern Rock and Roll Band 'Black Oak Arkansas'  by Cecil Kirk Hutson (1996, Publisher: The Mellen, Edwin Press) Evil Thingies'' by Rickie Lee Reynolds of Black Oak Arkansas (2016, Publisher: Cowboy Buddha Publishing, LLC)

References

https://www.facebook.com/profile.php?id=100083062030822

External links
Official Black Oak Arkansas Website
Black Oak Arkansas @ MySpace.com
Black Oak Arkansas Discography Images
Full list of musicians who played with Black Oak Arkansas
Black Oak Arkansas Live at the University of Reading on August 9, 1976
Atlantic Records Black Oak Arkansas Sign With Atlantic - News - Atlantic Records
 
 

1963 establishments in Arkansas
Rock music groups from Arkansas
American southern rock musical groups
Atco Records artists